The SS Cape Inscription (AKR-5076) was originally launched in 1975 as the SS Maine, a Type C7 commercial ship. The States SS company took the first contract in 1976 and it operated until January 29, 1979, when it was purchased by Whitney National Bank (now Hancock Bank), it was then leased to Lykes Brothers steamship company and renamed the SS Tyson Lykes on February 23, 1979. On October 20 the Lykes Brothers purchased the ship from the Whitney National Bank. Later on September 1987 the ship was reacquired from its commercial roles and brought back under military control under the Maritime Administration and renamed the SS Cape Inscription. Since then it has been kept in ready reserve status and used occasionally for heavy lifting operations to European theaters to have the equipment air-lifted to active engagements.

External links
 http://www.msc.navy.mil/inventory/ships.asp?ship=38 Ship's official page on Military Sealift Command
 http://www.navsource.org/archives/09/54/545076.htm Ship photo index NavSource Online: Service Ship Photo Archive
 http://wikimapia.org/5155486/SS-Cape-Isabel-AKR-5062-SS-Cape-Inscription-AKR-5076 Wikimapia site

285904157143

Ships built in Bath, Maine
1975 ships
Cape I-class cargo ships